Gosford is a city on Brisbane Water and is the administrative centre of the Central Coast Council local government area in the heart of the Central Coast region of New South Wales, Australia. Gosford is known for sailing and stunning views along the foreshore of Brisbane Water and the surrounding valleys. It is located 77km north of Sydney and 86km south of Newcastle. The city centre is situated at the northern extremity of Brisbane Water, an extensive northern branch of the Hawkesbury River estuary and Broken Bay.

The suburb is the administrative centre and central business district of the Central Coast region, which is the third largest urban area in New South Wales after Sydney and Newcastle. Following its formation from the combination of the previous Gosford City Council and Wyong Shire Councils, Gosford has been earmarked as a vital CBD spine under the NSW Metropolitan Strategy. The population of the Gosford area was 169,053 in 2016.

History

Until white settlement, the area around Gosford was inhabited by the Guringai peoples, who were principally coastal-dwellers, and the Darkinjung people that inhabited the hinterland.
Along with the other land around the Hawkesbury River estuary, the Brisbane Water district was explored during the early stages of the settlement of New South Wales.

Gosford itself was explored by State Governor Arthur Phillip between 1788 and 1789. The area was difficult to access and settlement began around 1823. By the late 19th century the agriculture in the region was diversifying, with market gardens and citrus orchards occupying the rich soil left after the timber harvest. As late as 1850, the road between Hawkesbury (near Pittwater) and Brisbane Water was a cart wheel track.

Typical of early Colonial settlement, convicts lived and worked in the Gosford area. In 1825, Gosford's population reached 100, of whom 50% were convicts.

East Gosford was the first centre of settlement. Gosford was named in 1839 after Archibald Acheson, 2nd Earl of Gosford – a friend of the then Governor of New South Wales George Gipps. Acheson's title derives its name from Gosford, a townland (sub-division) of Markethill in County Armagh in Northern Ireland.

In 1887, the rail link to Sydney was completed, requiring a bridge over the Hawkesbury River and a tunnel through the sandstone ridge west of Woy Woy. The introduction of this transport link and then the Pacific Highway in 1930 accelerated the development of the region.

Gosford became a town in 1885 and was declared a municipality in 1886.

Mann Street, the spine of the Gosford CBD has been the subject of much debate, with urban planners having ambitions to make Gosford a small smart regional city with various plans for a performing arts center, greater choice in cafes and restaurants, new library, high speed rail linkage to Sydney and Newcastle, better pedestrian access from the Gosford Hospital, education and research precinct over the railway lines to Mann Street and a new Central Coast University promised at State and Federal elections. Availability of affordable car parking around Gosford Railway station is an ongoing concern for rail commuters and visitors to Gosford CBD.

Demographics
The next most common countries of birth were India 4.5%, and England 2.9%. 65.2% of people spoke only English at home. Other languages spoken at home included Mandarin at 3.7%. The most common responses for religion were No Religion 33.9% and Catholic 18.2%.

The Gosford Statistical Area, which incorporates the whole of Gosford's city and suburbs, includes Terrigal, Woy Woy, Erina, Kariong, Kincumber, Wyoming and Avoca Beach, and at the 2021 census had a population of 178,427.

Geography

Climate
Gosford has a humid subtropical climate (Köppen climate classification: Cfa) with warm summers and mild winters. In summer, temperatures average about 27–28 °C in the day with high humidity and about 17–18 °C at night. Winters are mild with cool overnight temperatures and mild to occasionally warm daytime temperatures with lower humidity. Average rainfall is 1333 mm, much of which falls in the late summer and autumn. Rainfall is less common in late winter and early spring because of the foehn effect, as the city is located on the leeward side of the Great Dividing Range.

Central business district
Gosford proper is located in a valley with President's Hill on the city's western border, Rumbalara Reserve on its eastern border, and Brisbane Water to the city's south. Mann Street, Gosford's main street and part of the Pacific Highway, runs north-south and contains the frontage for much of the commercial district.

In the centre of Gosford is a shopping and community precinct, including Kibble Park, William Street Mall, Gosford City Library, the Imperial Shopping Centre and a full range of shops, cafes, banks and services.

A renewed period of optimism has followed demolition of several derelict buildings and several infrastructure investment projects including the full fibre optic telecommunications rollout of the National Broadband Network in 2012 in the city's CBD as well as the so-called Kibbleplex project, announced in 2013 that plans to house the new regional library, tertiary teaching rooms and associated organisations.

Economy and infrastructure

Gosford is situated along an identified business growth corridor between Erina, the West Gosford light industrial zone and Somersby. Connectivity of main roads and rail travel times between Sydney, the Central Coast, Lake Macquarie and the city of Newcastle are key issues for corporate business relocation to the region. Aged and personal care and retail are major employers in Gosford.

As an entertainment hub, Mann Street enjoys relatively good public transport links and is one of the Central Coast's most popular spots for pubs and clubs and in close proximity to cultural and sporting events.

Yacht and other boat building has been undertaken by East Coast Yachts since 1964 in West Gosford.

Facilities 

Gosford is home to:

 Gosford Hospital – the largest public hospital on the NSW Central Coast
 Laycock Street Community Theatre – the only professional, proscenium arch theatre venue on the Central Coast. Home of Gosford Musical Society who in fact provided financial support in the construction of the theater.
 The Central Coast Conservatorium (in the original Gosford Courthouse)
 Central Coast Stadium (formerly Bluetongue stadium) in Grahame Park, adjacent to the Central Coast Leagues Club. Originally built for the Central Coast Bears team in the NRL rugby league competition (to this day, the seats are arranged to say 'Go Bears'), since 2005 it is the home of the successful Central Coast Mariners A-League soccer / association football team and was the home venue of the Central Coast Rays rugby union Australian Rugby Championship team.
 Central Coast Leagues Club – is the largest community sporting and social club in the region
 The Entertainment Grounds, formerly known as Gosford Racecourse
 Gosford Showground, home to greyhound racing organised by Gosford Greyhounds.
 The headquarters of the Government of New South Wales workplace health and safety regulator, SafeWork NSW
 Gavenlock Oval – Home ground of the Gosford City Dragons, a football club associated with Central Coast Football.
 Gosford Regional Gallery and Gosford/Edogawa Commemorative Garden – The Commemorative Garden is a Japanese garden that was built as a gift to residents of Gosford City Council by the Ward of Edogawa, Tokyo, Japan. They were opened in September 1994.

Media

Newspapers
Express Advocate: A News Corp publication suburban style newspaper in the News Local Group

Gosford Community News has been published fortnightly by Ducks Crossing Publications since 2010.

Commercial radio networks
Radio stations available:
 Triple M Central Coast (formerly 2GO) – part of Southern Cross Austereo
 Hit101.3 Central Coast (formerly Sea FM)
 ABC 92.5
 CoastFM 96.3
 StarFM 104.5
 EVT FM – Chinese radio network

Transport
Transport is serviced by Red Bus Services. 

The Central Coast Highway cuts through Gosford's waterfront area, while its predecessor the, Pacific Highway, takes on several names through the CBD itself.

Mann Street contains the main public transport links for Gosford, including Gosford railway station, with trains twice an hour to Sydney Central Station and to Newcastle Interchange.

There is also a terminal for several bus routes linking Gosford to the rest of the Central Coast outside of Gosford station.

Education
Gosford Public School and Henry Kendall High School in Faunce Street
Gosford High School - the only academically selective high school on the Central Coast
 St Philip's Christian College Gosford
 St Joseph's Catholic College, East Gosford is an all girls Catholic school
St Edward's College, East Gosford - is an all boys Catholic school
Hunter Institute of TAFE
 University of Newcastle Central Coast Clinical School

Notable people

 Craig Anderson – pitcher for Sydney Blue Sox of the Australian Baseball League
 Estelle Asmodelle – model, dancer, and activist. She is known as Australia's first legal transsexual
 Cindy-Lu Bailey – deaf former Olympic athlete
 Bradman Best – rugby League player for Newcastle Knights
 Charlotte Best – actress, known for her role as Annie Campbell on Home and Away
 Anthony Biddle – Paralympian tandem cyclist and athlete
 Matt Burke – former rugby union player
 Alan Davidson – former Australian cricketer
 Grant Denyer – Australian television and radio presenter
 Bill Dunk - Professional golfer
 Mark Edmondson – former tennis professional and winner of the 1976 Australian Tennis Open
 David Fairleigh – former Rugby League forward, current coach of the Central Coast Bears
 James Gleeson – one of Australia's earliest and most recognised surrealist painters, also a poet and art critic. His family lived in Narara
 Des Hasler – former professional rugby league footballer, former coach of Manly Warringah Sea Eagles
 Nicho Hynes - rugby league player for Cronulla Sharks
 Matt Ikuvalu - rugby league player for Cronulla-Sutherland Sharks
 Allyson McConnell – convicted killer who drowned her two children in Alberta, Canada
 Julia Morris – actress and television host 
 Matt Orford – former NRL halfback
 Chris Payne – footballer playing for the North Queensland Fury in the A-League
 Ron Peno – Australian Punk & 1980's Rock musician; Lead Singer of Died Pretty
 Brad Porter – retired Football Midfielder
 Andrew Redmayne – goalkeeper for Sydney FC
 Sam Retford – actor, known for his role as Cory Wilson on Ackley Bridge
 Mark Skaife – 5-time Supercars champion and 6-time Bathurst 1000 winner
 Matthew Zions – European PGA professional golfer (2003–present), 2011 Saint-Omer Open winner

Sister cities and twin towns
  Edogawa, Tokyo
  Nitra

See also

 List of cities in Australia
 Electoral district of Gosford, a seat in the New South Wales Legislative Assembly

References

External links

 Gosford City Council official website
 Central Coast Tourism official website

Cities in New South Wales
Coastal cities in Australia
Suburbs of the Central Coast (New South Wales)